Oleksiy Korobeinikov (12 May 1978 – 16 May 2014) was a Ukrainian biathlete. He competed in the men's 20 km individual event at the 2006 Winter Olympics.

References

External links
 

1978 births
2014 deaths
Russian male biathletes
Ukrainian male biathletes
Olympic biathletes of Ukraine
Biathletes at the 2006 Winter Olympics
People from Achinsk
Sportspeople from Krasnoyarsk Krai